George Henry Featherston (5 June 1889 – 1 January 1966) was an Australian rules footballer who played with Fitzroy in the Victorian Football League (VFL).

Notes

External links 

1889 births
1966 deaths
Australian rules footballers from Victoria (Australia)
Fitzroy Football Club players
Northcote Football Club players
People from Ararat, Victoria